Kenneth Anthony Green (born October 13, 1967) is a retired American professional basketball player.

College career
Green played collegiate basketball at the University of Rhode Island, between 1986 and 1990. He is the school's all-time leader in blocks, and on five different occasions, he blocked eight shots in a single game. Green was named the Atlantic 10 Conference's Freshman of the Year in 1986–87, and as a senior, his 124 blocks, topped the NCAA Division I. He was also honored as the Atlantic 10 Conference Men's Basketball Player of the Year that season. Green finished his career at URI with 1,724 points, 996 rebounds, and 328 blocks. In 2000, he was inducted into the University of Rhode Island Hall of Fame.

Professional career
After college, Green spent over a decade playing professionally, first in the Continental Basketball Association (CBA), for the since defunct teams, the Rapid City Thrillers in Rapid City, South Dakota, and the Columbus Horizon in Columbus, Ohio. He then played in Italy, Spain, and Turkey.

See also
List of NCAA Division I men's basketball season blocks leaders

References

External links
Spanish League Profile 

1967 births
Living people
American expatriate basketball people in France
American expatriate basketball people in Italy
American expatriate basketball people in Spain
American expatriate basketball people in Turkey
American men's basketball players
Anadolu Efes S.K. players
CB Breogán players
CB Granada players
CB Inca players
CB Zaragoza players
Centers (basketball)
Columbus Horizon players
JDA Dijon Basket players
Liga ACB players
Power forwards (basketball)
Quad City Thunder players
Rapid City Thrillers players
Rhode Island Rams men's basketball players
Saski Baskonia players
Ülker G.S.K. basketball players